Sidney Hatfield (August 29, 1929 – January 25, 2003) was an American baseball player who is notable for winning the 1951 College World Series Most Outstanding Player award while a junior at University of Tennessee. He is the only person from the University of Tennessee to win the award. During his career he played as first baseman, pitcher and shortstop.

Hatfield graduated from the University of Tennessee in 1954 with a degree in education. After a brief minor league baseball career, he taught at Rule High School in Knoxville, Tennessee for 10 years. After a stint in the United States military fighting in the Korean War, he taught and served as the head baseball coach at Tennessee Technological University for three years. He was also an assistant basketball coach there. From 1968-1976, he served as the University of Tennessee's golf coach, posting a record of 500-253-3. He died of a stroke on January 25, 2003.

References

External links
An article on him
Another article

College World Series Most Outstanding Player Award winners
Jacksonville Beach Sea Birds players
1929 births
2003 deaths
Tennessee Volunteers baseball players
Tennessee Tech Golden Eagles baseball coaches